Nikolina Nikoleski (born 1976), born in Zagreb, Croatia, is a leading dancer and choreographer of Bharatanatyam. She learned contemporary dance in Germany at the prestigious dance academy of Pina Bausch – (Folkwang Hochschule Essen) - and spent six years in India learning Bharatanatyam. Her Guru is the highly regarded Padmashree Dr. Saroja Vaidyanathan. She is half Macedonian (Father from Vranče, Macedonia) and half Croatian (mother from Zagreb, Croatia).

She was a professor of dance at the French Embassy School in Delhi, Father Agnel School New Delhi.
In 2012 she established Nikolina Nikoleski Dance Academy where she runs classes in contemporary dance, ballet and Bharatanatyam.

She has danced in Paris, Vienna, Casablanca, Khajuraho, Chennai, Mahabalipuram, Taj Mahal, and Luxembourg. She has worked and performed with celebrated artists such as Dominique Mercy, Malou Airaudo, Bob Wilson, Ben Riepe, Juan Kruz Silva de Esnaola, Lutz Forster, Sonal Mansigh, Priyadarsini Govind, Rama Vaidyanathan, Anup Jalota, Jagjit Singh, Hariharan and Madhup Mudgal.

She regularly performs in various international TV shows : Indian TV Doordarshan– "Nritya Sangam" show, "Journey through the arts", Croatian TV- "IN magazine", "Red Carpet", "Zivot uzivo" ... and was also featured in several documentary movies.

References
http://m.deccanherald.com/?name=http://www.deccanherald.com/content/473004/life-comes-full-circle.html

External links
Web site 

Bharatanatyam exponents
Performers of Indian classical dance
Croatian female dancers
Living people
1969 births
Croatian people of Macedonian descent
Dancers from Zagreb